Jean de Bonnefon (1867-1928) was a French journalist and Catholic author.

Early life
Jean de Bonnefon was born on March 22, 1867 in Calvinet, Cantal. His father, born Charles Bonnefon, changed his patronymic surname to Charles de Bonnefon in 1855; the nobiliary particle had been dropped by the family during the French Revolution. His mother was Marie Valentin.

Career
Bonnefon was a journalist and Catholic author. He was a member of the Société des gens de lettres.  His amanuensis, Robert Desnos, became a renowned Surrealist poet.

Bonnefon co-authored a book with architect Georges Wybo.

Death
Bonnefon died on March 30, 1928 in his hometown of Calvinet.

Works

References

1867 births
1928 deaths
19th-century French journalists
20th-century French journalists
French Roman Catholic writers
People from Cantal